Boikin/Dagua Rural LLG is a local-level government (LLG) of East Sepik Province, Papua New Guinea.

Wards
01. Hawain
02. Niumegin
03. Aring/Surumba
04. Penjen/Peringa
05. Siro/Wanjo
06. Boikin/Dagua
07. Karawap
08. You island
09. Karasau (Est)
10. Banak/Hogi
11. Bogumatai/Wautogik
12. Dogur
13. Woginara (1)
14. Woginara (2)
15. Sapuain
16. Urip
17. Mogopin
18. Maguer
19. Smain/But
20. Lowan
21. Kauk/Balam
22. Sowom
23. Kotai
24. Kubren

References

Local-level governments of East Sepik Province